The McConnell River is located in the Kivalliq Region of northern Canada's territory of Nunavut. It drains into Hudson Bay and is the namesake for the McConnell River Migratory Bird Sanctuary.

It is home to snow (blue) and Canada geese.

See also
List of rivers of Nunavut

References

Rivers of Kivalliq Region
Tributaries of Hudson Bay
Ramsar sites in Kivalliq Region